Dead Caesar was a 2007 stage show written by Australian comedian Chris Taylor from The Chaser. The satirical show parodied Julius Caesar, a play by William Shakespeare.

Production

Taylor was persuaded, while drunk, by Brendan Cowell, director of Wharf 2LOUD, to write a play. He ended up writing a parody of William Shakespeare's tragedy Julius Caesar.

Cast and crew

The crew included Chaser member Andrew Hansen as composer of the music.
Director: Tamara Cook
Music: Andrew Hansen
Set Designer: Bruce McKinven
Lighting: Stephen Hawker

The main cast is as follow:
Caesar: Toby Moore
Marc Antony: Andrew Hansen
Lucius: Andrew Hansen
Brutus: Ben Borgia
Cassius: Ewen Leslie
Cicero: Alan Dukes
Calpurnia: Monica Sayers
The Messenger: John Leary

See also
 Assassination of Julius Caesar

References

The Chaser
Works based on Julius Caesar (play)
Depictions of Julius Caesar in plays